Quán Hàu is a township and town in Quảng Ninh District, Quảng Bình Province, Bắc Trung Bộ, Vietnam. The township is the district seat and located on the National Route 1, about 7 km south of the provincial capital Đồng Hới city. The township is the commercial and service center serving surrounding rural areas. Economic activities include: commerce, administrative service.

References

Communes of Quảng Bình province
Populated places in Quảng Bình province
District capitals in Vietnam
Townships in Vietnam